Federal Explosives Act of 1917 is a United States federal statutory law citing an incriminating act for the distribution, manufacture, possession, storage, and use of explosive material during the time of war. The Act of Congress authorizes the federal regulation of the distribution, manufacture, possession, storage, and use of incendiary material during wartime.

The Act was passed by the 65th United States Congress and enacted into law by President Woodrow Wilson  on October 6, 1917.

Provisions of 1917 Act
The United States Bureau of Mines governs the federal regulations for restrictive protocols with regards to explosive materials.
 Combustible ingredients are held or purchased in minimal quantities 
 Data and formulation processes prohibited from disclosure
 Explosive inspectors authorized by U.S. Bureau of Mines
 Explosive possession is prohibited for unlicensed entities
 Federal licensing applies for blasting agents at mines and quarries
 Federal licensing is subject to discretionary refusal
 Revocation is authorized for a federal explosive license

Federal Explosive License Classifications
Exporter license
Foreman license
Importer license
Manufacturer license
Purchaser license
Technical license (Analyst, Educator, Inventor, Investigator)
Vendor license

Presidential Proclamation of 1917
In accordance with the Trading with the Enemy Act of 1917, President Woodrow Wilson issued Presidential Proclamation 1364 on April 6, 1917. The presidential statement proclaimed national security protections regarding domestic alien enemies petitioning for aggressive terrorist tactics against the United States.

Precious Metal Regulation of 1918
The Sundry Civil Expenses Appropriations Act of 1918 applied the unlicensed enforcement prohibitions of the federal explosive act for iridium, palladium, platinum, and precious metal compounds.

Amendment and Cancellation of 1917 Act
The Federal Explosives Act Amendment of 1941 appended the 1917 public law revitalizing the federal scope for the perils of World War II. On July 25, 1947, President Harry S. Truman signed a Senate Joint Resolution ceasing provisions of the Federal Explosives Act with the cessation of the European theatre of World War II and Pacific War.

Repeal of 1917 Act
The 1917 Act was repealed by the enactment of Organized Crime Control Act on October 15, 1970.

B.S.A. Blasting Caps Awareness Program
In 1947, the Boy Scouts of America and Institute of Makers of Explosives established a safety awareness program for the disposal and identification of electric and non-electric blasting caps.

See also

Industrial Explosions of 1917

Propellant Powder Mills of 18th & 19th Century America

19th Century Scientists of Combustible Chemistry & Materials

Anti-Radicalism Reforms of 19th & 20th Century America

Film Depictions of Anarchists' Movements in United States

References

Historical Video Archives

Reading Bibliography

External links
 
 
 
 
 
 
 
 
 
 
 
 
 
 
 

65th United States Congress